Janko Kamauf (1801–1874) was the last city magistrate of Gradec and the first mayor of Zagreb, Croatia. He saw the unification of Gradec, Kaptol and several surrounding villages into Zagreb by ban Josip Jelačić in 1850 and remained the city mayor until 1857.

See also 
 List of mayors of Zagreb

References 
 
 

1801 births
1874 deaths
Mayors of Zagreb